The Budapest Japanese School (BJS; 在ハンガリー日本国大使館付属ブダペスト日本人学校 Zai Hangarī Nihon-koku Taishikan Fuzoku Budapesuto Nihonjin Gakkō) is a Japanese international school operating in an auxiliary building of Virányos Iskola, a Hungarian-language elementary school in Budapest, Hungary. It serves as an elementary and junior high school, and it is affiliated with the Embassy of Japan in Budapest.

As of 2005 there were going to be around six students.

References

External links

  The Japanese School of Budapest
  "Képek: így néz ki egy japán iskola Budapesten" (Archive). Eduline. 8 April 2011.

Schools in Budapest
International schools in Hungary
Budapest
Hungary–Japan relations